Paul Carter, also known as Benbrick, is a Peabody Award winning, multi-platinum selling English songwriter, producer and composer. He wrote Sakura Nagashi with Hikaru Utada from her 2016 Japan Record Award winning album Fantôme which has sold over one million copies. Benbrick is the producer and composer for the multi award-winning Have You Heard George's Podcast? with George The Poet. The podcast won 5 Gold British Podcast Awards in 2019 including the coveted Podcast of the Year award.

Career 
Benbrick wrote Sakura Nagashi (桜流し) with Hikaru Utada, it charted at #1 on iTunes and sold 600,000 singles worldwide.
Sakura Nagashi was the end-credits music to the movie Evangelion: 3.0 You Can (Not) Redo which was the biggest film opening of 2012 and the 12th biggest opening of all time in Japan. The single was included on the 2016 album Fantôme which debuted at number one on iTunes in 20 countries, selling over 1 million copies in Japan, as well as reaching #1 on the US Billboard World Albums chart. Fantôme won Best Album at the 58th Japan Record Awards. In 2021 Sakura Nagashi was included on Utada's One Last Kiss (EP).

Benbrick also wrote Gasoline with Troye Sivan for the record TRXYE which charted on iTunes at #1 in 66 countries including the US, UK, Australia, and Canada. TRXYE debuted at #5 on the Billboard 200, with 80,000 copies sold in the first year.

In 2014 Benbrick composed a piece of music set to scenes from Ricky Gervais TV show Derek. Ricky Gervais discovered the music calling it "stunningly beautiful" In 2015 Benbrick composed a new piece set to series 2 of the same show - this time Gervais called Benbrick "a future genius". The pair met in 2016 after Benbrick created the trailer music for the Derek Christmas Special, which Gervais posted on his official YouTube channel. This led to Benbrick creating the visual and music for a TigerTime advert - one of Gervais's ambassadorial projects.

Benbrick wrote two songs on the Mary Jess debut album Shine which was recorded at Abbey Road Studios and features the Royal Philharmonic Orchestra. Stand As One was used for a global P&G TV advertising campaign. Benbrick also wrote 記得要微笑 on the 2014 Elva Hsiao record Shut Up And Kiss Me which reached #1 on the iTunes charts in Hong Kong and Taiwan.

Podcasting 

In 2018 Benbrick started working with spoken word artist George The Poet composing and producing on his podcast "Have You Heard George's Podcast?". Everyman Cinema called the live show "a mind-bending experiment with musical storytelling" leading to 4 sell-out shows at Everyman Cinemas across the UK. In 2019 BBC Radio 4 called Episode 3 "a story that could change the world" and the podcast was nominated for 6 British Podcast Awards including Best New Podcast, Best Fiction, Smartest Podcast, Best Current Affairs, Best Arts & Culture, and Moment of the Year.  In 2020 Benbrick picked up 3 Audio Production Awards including Best Podcast Producer.

Discography

Songwriting Discography
2021: "If I Gotta Go" - Skrapz ft George the Poet
2020: "Start In Disguise" - Gary Go
2020: "Pharmacy Light" - Gary Go
2019: "Wishing on a.." - Mai Kuraki
2018: "Dealing With Dreams" - Luke Pickett (album)
2017: "Simple Love" – Luke Pickett
2016: "We Are" – Avec Sans
2014: "Remember to Smile" – Elva Hsiao
2014: "Gasoline" – Troye Sivan
2014: "Loving You Is Wrong" (Produced) – Luke Pickett
2013: "Wasted Dreams" – Luke Pickett
2012: "Sakura Nagashi" – Hikaru Utada
2011: "Heaven Is Empty" – Mary-Jess
2011: "Stand As One" – Mary-Jess
2011: "Begging" – Project Alfie

Solo Discography (as Benbrick)
2018: "陰り!" (EP) - Benbrick
2016: "Closer | Closure" (EP) – Benbrick
2016: "La Perfezione Brevemente" – Benbrick
2015: "Perfect Ending" – Benbrick
2015: "The Only Shortcut" – Benbrick
2015: "Magic" – Benbrick ft Spencer Ludwig
2014: "And So She Runs" – Benbrick
2014: "Forever Holding On" – Benbrick

Podcast Discography

Filmography
2021: George The Poet - Black Yellow Red (Short Film) - Composer
2020: GRM Daily Rated Awards - It Was Written - composer
2020: BBC One One World: Together At Home - Our Key Workers - composer
2019: BBC Radio 4 Gangland (Welcome To The World of George The Poet) - composer
2019: George The Poet My Neighbourhood - composer
2019: Sentebale We Can Fight - composer
2017: McLaren 720s Advert - composer
2016: Disney Channel The Lodge (TV series) – vocal production
2016: David Shepherd Wildlife Foundation (TigerTime online ad) – music
2016: Music Station Sakura Nagashi live performance – music
2016: Welcome To Germany – additional music, programming, production
2014: Keeping Up with the Kardashians – additional music
2013: Procter & Gamble Worldwide TV Campaign – music
2012: Evangelion: 3.0 You Can (Not) Redo – End Credits music

Awards and nominations

References

1988 births
Place of birth missing (living people)
Living people
English male singer-songwriters
Musicians from London
21st-century English singers
21st-century English male singers